Yasmany López Escalante (born 11 October 1987) is a Cuban footballer who last played for Ciego de Ávila as a midfielder.

International career
He made his international debut for Cuba in a July 2013 CONCACAF Gold Cup match against Belize and has, as of January 2018, earned a total of 18 caps, scoring 1 goals. He represented his country in 14 FIFA World Cup qualification matches and played at 2 CONCACAF Gold Cup final tournaments. After Cuba's 7–0 loss vs Mexico during the 2019 CONCACAF Gold Cup group stage, he ran away from the Cuban team hotel and defected to the United States.

International goals
Scores and results list Cuba's goal tally first.

References

External links 
 

1987 births
Living people
Association football midfielders
Cuban footballers
Cuba international footballers
2013 CONCACAF Gold Cup players
2014 Caribbean Cup players
2015 CONCACAF Gold Cup players
FC Ciego de Ávila players
FC Villa Clara players
Defecting Cuban footballers
2019 CONCACAF Gold Cup players
People from Morón, Cuba
Cuba under-20 international footballers